Southern Power District is a publicly owned electric distribution system providing electricity and related services to customers in south-central Nebraska. Based in Grand Island, Nebraska, its wholesale power provider is Nebraska Public Power District.

Southern Power's additional offices are at Central City, Franklin, Hastings, and Holdrege.

Employee Information
Southern Power employs 108 people across its entire service area:
Grand Island: 62
Holdrege: 14
Hastings: 12
Central City: 14
Franklin: 6

External links
Southern Power District
SPD Blog Site
Official Facebook Page
Official Twitter Page

Power districts in Nebraska
Public utilities of the United States